Henry de Longchamp or Henry de Longo Campo (c1150–1212) was an Anglo-Norman administrator.

He was born in Wilton Castle, near Ross-on-Wye, Herefordshire, the son of Hugh de Longchamp. One of his brothers, William, was to become Chancellor of England and Bishop of Ely and another, Osbert, Sheriff of Yorkshire and Norfolk .

He was appointed High Sheriff of Herefordshire for 1190 by the new King Richard in place of Ralph Arden, again in 1193 and High Sheriff of Worcestershire from 1195 to 1197. In 1194 he accompanied King Richard to Normandy. During Richard's captivity overseas, William de Longchamp lost power and Henry and Osbert their shrievalties. Henry spent time imprisoned in Cardiff castle.

He died in Wilton in 1212. He had married Maude de Cantilupe, daughter of Walter de Cantilupe and sister of William de Cantilupe, in Wilton in 1182. They had several children including William, Margaret, Henry  and Hugh. He was succeeded by his grandson Henry, the son of Hugh.

References
 Chronica magistri Rogeri de Houedene, Volume 3  By Roger (of Hoveden)

1212 deaths
High Sheriffs of Herefordshire
High Sheriffs of Worcestershire
Year of birth unknown
Anglo-Normans